Cesare Cassani (born  in Zürich) is a Swiss wheelchair curler.

He participated in the 2006 Winter Paralympics where Swiss team finished on sixth place.

Teams

References

External links 

Living people
1944 births
Sportspeople from Zürich
Swiss male curlers
Swiss wheelchair curlers
Paralympic wheelchair curlers of Switzerland
Wheelchair curlers at the 2006 Winter Paralympics
World wheelchair curling champions
Swiss wheelchair curling champions